"Where in the World is Carmen Sandiego?" is a song by Rockapella that was written as the theme song to the PBS game show of the same name. The song is part of the larger Carmen Sandiego franchise.

It has been praised for its catchiness, for skyrocketing Rockapella's career, for increasing interest in a cappella music, and for being arguably the most internationally recognisable piece of the Carmen Sandiego franchise.

Production 
After performing in a 1990 Spike Lee production called Spike Lee and Company: Do It Acapella, the producers of Where in the World Is Carmen Sandiego? contacted the group and asked if they wanted to audition to be house band; they were ultimately successful. On the game show, the song was performed each and every week by the a cappella group Rockapella, preceded by the studio audience chanting 'Do It Rockapella!'. The song was co-written by Rockapella co-founder Sean Altman.

The inspiration for the song was a Janes Addiction song called Caught Stealing with a "hip groove" that Rockapella aimed to replacate, instead coming out with a do-woob sound.

The theme song was a hit and Rockapella's popularity skyrocketed; they appeared on Jay Leno's New Year's Eve "Tonight Show" broadcast in 1992.

In 2015, Mashable invited the group to reunite to sing the song for their website.

In the week leading up to the premiere of the Carmen Sandiego Netflix animated series, Rockapella released a new recording of the song; the television show ended up using a different song.

Critical reception 

Mashable deemed the song the most memorable part of the gameshow. Altman said he was "fortunate" that the song was so prominently played on the gameshow every day for five years, noting the exposure it gave the group. Entertainment Weekly deemed it "an infectious song that taught millennials about geography and harmony." Rewire named it "memorable" and "catchy". Bustle ranked the song as the best in the Carmen Sandiego franchise, naming it "one of the best themes in television history." Hot 104.7 deemed it an "acapella extravaganza". US Gamer's reviewer advised they were more familiar with the song than the educational games that began the franchise. Cinema Blend wrote that the song is impossible not to sing along to. Uproxx deemed it the most memorable part of the gameshow.

References 

Unprintworthy redirects
1992 songs
Animated series theme songs
Children's television theme songs
Songs about fictional female characters